John K. Beery Farm is a historic home and farm complex located near Edom, Virginia, United States. The main house dates to 1838, and consists of a two-story, five bay, central-hall plan, main section with a one-story, three bay east wing. The main section measures 50 feet wide and 18 feet deep and features a long one-story, late-19th century porch.  Also on the property are a number of contributing outbuildings including a stone bank barn, loom house, spring house, wash house / kitchen, granary, sheds, and an outhouse.  The meeting room in the east wing of the house served a large congregation of Mennonites for a number of years. John K. Berry was a descendant of Swiss settlers in Pennsylvania.

It was listed on the National Register of Historic Places in 1973.

References

Farms on the National Register of Historic Places in Virginia
Houses completed in 1838
Houses in Rockingham County, Virginia
Houses on the National Register of Historic Places in Virginia
Mennonitism in Virginia
National Register of Historic Places in Rockingham County, Virginia
Pennsylvania Dutch culture in Virginia